The 2018/19 NTFL season was the 98th season of the Northern Territory Football League (NTFL).

The first game was played on Friday, 5 October, and the Grand Final was played on Saturday, 16 March, with the Nightcliff Tigers defeating Southern Districts Crocs by 22 points to win its fourth premiership. This was the first time when the club won a premiership since 1964/65, breaking its 54-year drought. This was the longest premiership drought in NTFL history, second is Wanderers Eagles by 34 years from 1923/24 to 1957/58).

Ladder

Ladder progression

Finals

Grand Final

Awards 
Nightcliff finished on top for the first time since 2011/12.
The wooden spoon was "awarded" to St Marys for the first time in the club's history.

References 

Northern Territory Football League seasons
NTFL